The 22nd Parliament of the Republic of South Africa was elected in the elections of 27 April 1994; it was the first parliament in South Africa's history to be elected by voters of all races. Nelson Mandela's African National Congress formed a government of national unity with F. W. de Klerk's National Party and Mangosuthu Buthelezi's Inkatha Freedom Party. The three racially based houses from previous parliaments were replaced with the re-introduced Senate and National Assembly. In 1997, on the introduction of the final Constitution, the Senate was replaced by the National Council of Provinces, which continues to serve as the upper house of South Africa's Parliament.

See also
 List of members of the National Assembly of South Africa, 1994–1999
 List of members of the Senate of South Africa, 1994–1999

References

22nd South African parliament